The Fiat 509 was a model of car produced by Italian automotive manufacturer Fiat between 1925 and 1929 as a replacement for the 501. Approximately 90,000 of the model were sold. In 1926 the car was upgraded to the 509A. For 1928, the 509 was offered with standard insurance, also. 

In addition to as the standard car, there were 509S and 509SM sports models, as well as taxi and commercial versions.

Engines
The Fiat 509 was fitted with a 990 cc overhead cam engine.

Notes

509
Cars introduced in 1924